Andoung Meas District ("Well of Gold") is a district in north-eastern Cambodia, located in Ratanakiri Province, 
Population 6,896 (1998)

Administration
Andoung Meas district is subdivided into four communes (khum), which are further subdivided into 21 villages (phum).

References

Districts of Ratanakiri province